Kaiserliche Armee may refer to:
 The Kaiserliche Armee, the Imperial Army of the Holy Roman Empire (to 1806)
 The Kaiserliche Armee, the armed forces of the German Empire (1870–1918), comprising the:
Army
Navy
Air Forces

Military history of the Holy Roman Empire